James Anthony 'Tony' Supple (born 1961), was a male former weightlifter who competed for Great Britain and England.

Weightlifting career
Supple represented Great Britain in the 1984 Summer Olympics.

He represented England in the 82.5 kg light-heavyweight division, at the 1986 Commonwealth Games in Edinburgh, Scotland.

References

1961 births
English male weightlifters
Weightlifters at the 1986 Commonwealth Games
Weightlifters at the 1984 Summer Olympics
Olympic weightlifters of Great Britain
Living people
Commonwealth Games competitors for England